Mindsnare are an Australian hardcore band from Melbourne, Victoria. Formed in 1993 under the name Mad Circle, their music is a blend of traditional "old school" hardcore punk and crossover metal, and as such has seen them play alongside metal bands like Kreator and Ringworm, as well as more straightforward hardcore acts like Agnostic Front, Sick of it All and Australia's Toe To Toe. In its genre, Mindsnare have been described as "one of the most influential bands of the past decade " by Missing Link Records.

Discography
 1996: Credulity LP
 1996: Split with Toe To Toe EP
 1997: White EP EP
 1998: Under Fire (93-96) LP
 1999: Split with Congress CD
 2001: Downside Eastside CD/EP
 2004: 1997-1999: The Bootleg CD
 2004: Hanged, Choked, Wrists Slit CD
 2004: The Death CD/LP
 2006: Gasman 7"
 2007: Disturb the Hive CD/LP
 2011: Split with Ringworm EP
 2017: Unholy Rush CD/LP

See also
Trial & Error Records

References

External links
Mindsnare on MySpace

Australian hardcore punk groups
Musical groups established in 1993
1993 establishments in Australia